Mauritia scurra, common name the jester cowry, is a species of sea snail, a cowry, a marine gastropod mollusk in the family Cypraeidae, the cowries.

Subspecies
 Mauritia scurra occidua C. P. Meyer & Lorenz, 2017
 Mauritia scurra scurra (Gmelin, 1791)

 Mauritia scurra indica (Gmelin, 1791): synonym of Mauritia scurra scurra (Gmelin, 1791)
 Mauritia scurra mundula Lorenz, 2002: synonym of Mauritia scurra scurra (Gmelin, 1791)

Description
The shape is slender and slightly cylindrical, the dorsum surface is  reticulate, smooth and shiny, the basic color is light brown, with beige round spots. Margins are beige too, wide and rounded, with dark brown spots. The base may be whitish, pinkish or purplish, usually with long fine dark brown teeth along a narrow aperture. In the living cowries mantle is dark grey, with clearer sensorial papillae.

Distribution
This species and subspecies range across the Central and East Indian Ocean along East Africa (Red Sea, Somalia, Aldabra, Chagos, the Comores, Kenya, Tanzania, Zanzibar, Madagascar, the Mascarene Basin, Mauritius, Mozambique, Réunion, the Seychelles) and in the West Pacific Ocean (Malaysia, Sulu Sea, Eastern Australia, Philippines, Samar Island, French Polynesia, Oceania, Hawaii).

Habitat
These cowries mainly live on coral reef in tropical subtidal and intertidal waters and in the continental shelf, usually hidden under rocks, coral slabs or small caves during the day, as they start feeding at dusk.

References
 Dautzenberg, Ph. (1929). Mollusques testaces marins de Madagascar. Faune des Colonies Francaises, Tome III
 Schilder F.A. & Schilder M. (1938-1939). Prodrome of a monograph on living Cypraeidae. Proceedings of the Malacological Society of London. 23(3): 109-180
 Verdcourt, B. (1954). The cowries of the East African Coast (Kenya, Tanganyika, Zanzibar and Pemba). Journal of the East Africa Natural History Society 22(4) 96: 129-144, 17 pl
 Burgess, C.M. (1970). The Living Cowries. AS Barnes and Co, Ltd. Cranbury, New Jersey
 Surya Rao, KV and Subba Rao, NV (1991) Mollusca State fauna series 2: Fauna of Lakshadweep ZSI, Calcutta
 Poppe, GT and Poppe, P (1996) Conchology, Inc.
 Lorenz F. (2002) New worldwide cowries. Descriptions of new taxa and revisions of selected groups of living Cypraeidae (Mollusca: Gastropoda). Schriften zur Malakozoologie aus dem Haus der Natur-Cismar 20: 1-292, pls 1-4
 Steyn, D.G & Lussi, M. (2005). Offshore Shells of Southern Africa: A pictorial guide to more than 750 Gastropods. Published by the authors. Pp. i–vi, 1–289
 Liu, J.Y. [Ruiyu] (ed.). (2008). Checklist of marine biota of China seas. China Science Press. 1267 pp.

External links

 Gmelin J.F. (1791). Vermes. In: Gmelin J.F. (Ed.) Caroli a Linnaei Systema Naturae per Regna Tria Naturae, Ed. 13. Tome 1(6). G.E. Beer, Lipsiae
 Mörch, O. A. L. (1852-1853). Catalogus conchyliorum quae reliquit D. Alphonso d'Aguirra & Gadea Comes de Yoldi, Regis Daniae Cubiculariorum Princeps, Ordinis Dannebrogici in Prima Classe & Ordinis Caroli Tertii Eques. Fasc. 1, Cephalophora, 170 pp. [1852; Fasc. 2, Acephala, Annulata, Cirripedia, Echinodermata, 74 [+2] pp. [1853]. Hafniae [Copenhagen]: L. Klein]
 Biolib
 Mauritia scurra
 
 Clade

Cypraeidae
Molluscs of the Indian Ocean
Molluscs of the Pacific Ocean
Fauna of the Red Sea
Marine molluscs of Africa
Marine molluscs of Asia
Marine molluscs of Oceania
Marine fauna of Southeast Asia
Marine fauna of Western Asia
Molluscs of Hawaii
Gastropods described in 1791
Taxa named by Johann Friedrich Gmelin